Two Mile is a rural locality in the Gympie Region, Queensland, Australia. In the  Two Mile had a population of 106 people.

Geography 
The Gympie Cemetery is located in Two Mile.

History 
Two Mile State School opened on 9 July 1883.

In the  Two Mile had a population of 106 people.

Heritage listings 
Two Mile has the following heritage listings:
 288 Bruce Highway: Two Mile School

Education 
Two Mile State School is a government primary (Prep-6) school for boys and girls at 288 Bruce Highway North. In 2018, the school had an enrolment of 67 students with 7 teachers (5 full-time equivalent) and 9 non-teaching staff (4 full-time equivalent).

References

Suburbs of Gympie
Localities in Queensland